Kosi Zone was one of the fourteen zones of Nepal, comprising six districts, namely Bhojpur, Dhankuta, Morang, Sankhuwasabha, Sunsari and Terhathum. Here is district wise List of Monuments which is in the Kosi Zone.
The Ancient Monument Protection Act 1956 has defined monuments as structure older than 100 years and having historical, cultural importance. In Koshi zone the monuments list is given below.

Kosi Zone
 List of monuments in Bhojpur District 
 List of monuments in Dhankuta District 
 List of monuments in Morang District 
 List of monuments in Sankhuwasabha District
 List of monuments in Sunsari District 
 List of monuments in Terhathum District

References

Kosi Zone
Kosi Zone